Gerry Shaw (1943 – March 18, 1995) was a Canadian football player who played for the Calgary Stampeders. He won the Grey Cup with them in 1971. Shaw played college football at Washington State University. He was added to the Stampeders' Wall of Fame in 2012. He died on March 18, 1995.

References

1943 births
1995 deaths
Calgary Stampeders players
Washington State Cougars football players
American football wide receivers
Canadian football wide receivers
Canadian football people from Calgary
Players of Canadian football from Alberta
Canadian players of American football